NGC 6729 (also known as Caldwell 68) is a reflection/emission nebula of the Corona Australis Molecular Cloud in the constellation Corona Australis. It was discovered by Johann Friedrich Julius Schmidt in 1861.

This fan-shaped nebula opens from the star R Coronae Australis toward the star T CrA to the south-east. R CrA is a pre-main-sequence star in the Corona Australis molecular complex, one of the closer star-forming regions of the galaxy at a distance of 130 pc. NGC 6729 is a variable nebula which shows irregular variations in brightness and in shape.

See also
McNeil's Nebula
NGC 1555 (Hind's Variable Nebula)
NGC 2261 (Hubble's Variable Nebula)

References

External links
 
 

Diffuse nebulae
Reflection nebulae
Emission nebulae
068b
Corona Australis
Astronomical objects discovered in 1861
6729